Cychrus boulbeni is a species of ground beetle in the subfamily of Carabinae that can be found in northern part of Sichuan, province of China. It was described by Deuve in 1997.

References 

boulbeni
Beetles described in 1997
Endemic fauna of Sichuan
Beetles of Asia